Leven Lawrence Shreve (March 12, 1866 in Louisville, Kentucky – November 7, 1942 in Detroit, Michigan), was a pitcher in the Major Leagues from –. He played for the Baltimore Orioles and Indianapolis Hoosiers.

External links

1869 births
1942 deaths
Major League Baseball pitchers
Indianapolis Hoosiers (NL) players
Baltimore Orioles (AA) players
Baseball players from Louisville, Kentucky
19th-century baseball players
Robert E. Lee's players
Eau Claire Lumbermen players
Milwaukee Brewers (minor league) players
Chattanooga Lookouts players
Savannah (minor league baseball) players
Detroit Wolverines (minor league) players
Minneapolis Millers (baseball) players
St. Paul Apostles players
Rochester Hop Bitters players